The Suzuki Golf Internationale was a golf tournament on the LPGA Tour from 1971 to 1972. It was played at the Los Coyotes Country Club in Buena Park, California in 1971 and at the Brookside Golf Club in Pasadena, California in 1972.

Winners
1972 Jane Blalock
1971 Kathy Whitworth

References

Former LPGA Tour events
Golf in California
Women's sports in California
Sports competitions in Los Angeles County, California
Sports in Orange County, California